The Willem de Eerste was a 74-gun third rate ship of the line of the navy of the Dutch Republic, the Batavian Republic, and the Royal Netherlands Navy.
The order to construct the ship was given by the Admiralty of the Meuse.

The ship was commissioned in 1785. In 1795, the ship was renamed Brutus and incorporated in the Batavian Navy.
On 11 October 1797 the Brutus took part in the Battle of Camperdown under Rear-Admiral Johan Bloys van Treslong. A cannonball hit the Rear-Admiral's right arm, which had to be amputated. Brutus soon left the battle, when she couldn't reach the flagship Vryheid because the burning ship Hercules blocked the way. After the battle, on 13 October, the ship was found by the frigate  and was attacked. Brutus sailed deeper in the Dutch waters of the Goeree channel, where she was no longer pursued by the British vessel.

In 1806, the Brutus was renamed Braband. In the years 1811-1813, the ship formed part of the French navy, but she was returned to the Kingdom of the Netherlands in 1814. In 1815 she was fitted out to sail to the Dutch East Indies, but it soon became clear that her hull wasn't strong enough for the voyage, and she sailed no further than Portsmouth. The ship was eventually broken up in 1820.

References

Ships of the line of the Dutch Republic
Ships of the line of the Batavian Republic
Ships of the line of the French Navy
Ships built in the Netherlands
1785 ships